Alex José dos Santos (born 28 March 1981 in Brazil) is a Brazilian retired footballer.

Career

In 2002/03, dos Santos played for SFC Opava, where he one scored a goal from 40 meters and helped achieve promotion to the Czech top flight.

In 2003, he signed for Boldklubben Frem in the Danish top flight. However, dos Santos only made 2 league appearances there and was substituted out in his second game despite being substituted on earlier. Even though dos Santos expressed desire to return to Brazil, Boldklubben Frem arranged a transfer to Faroese club B36 Tórshavn for the 2004 season, where he found difficulty adapting to the boat trips for games. At the end of the 2004 season, he went back to Brazil but eventually resigned with B36 Tórshavn where he played for five seasons. After that, dos Santos played for Faroese outfits EB/Streymur, HB Tórshavn as well as Ítróttarfelag Fuglafjarðar, where he stayed for 4 seasons. He won the Faroese championship with B36 Tórshavn in 2005 and with HB Tórshavn in 2013.

References

External links
 Alex dos Santos at playmakerstats.com (English version of ogol.com.br)

Brazilian footballers
Living people
Association football midfielders
Association football defenders
1981 births
SFC Opava players
Boldklubben Frem players
B36 Tórshavn players
EB/Streymur players
Havnar Bóltfelag players
ÍF Fuglafjørður players
Expatriate footballers in the Faroe Islands